John Malish Dujuk (March 3, 1976 – November 3, 2019) was a South Sudanese politician. In 2011, he was the Minister of Parliamentary Affairs and served Central Equatoria from 2011 to 2013.

References

South Sudanese politicians
People from Central Equatoria
1976 births
2019 deaths